Atlautla is one of 125 municipalities, in the State of Mexico in Mexico. The municipal seat is the city of Atlautla de Victoria.  The municipality covers an area of  134.9 km².

As of 2005, the municipality had a total population of 24,110.

References

Municipalities of the State of Mexico
Populated places in the State of Mexico